Joseph-Octave Villeneuve (4 March 1836 – 27 June 1901) was a Canadian businessman, provincial politician, and senator.

Entering business in Montreal, Villeneuve founded a firm of wholesale grocers and spirits merchants. As a businessman and local politician he acquired large commercial interests in Canada.

He was mayor of Saint-Jean-Baptiste from 1866 to 1886 and warden of Hochelaga county from 1866 to 1880. From 1894 to 1896, he was the Mayor of Montreal. He was the Legislative Assembly of Quebec member for Hochelaga from 1886 to 1888 and from 1890 to 1896.

In 1896, he was appointed to the Canadian Senate representing the senatorial division of De Salaberry, Quebec. A Conservative, he served until his death in 1901.

Gallery

References

1836 births
1901 deaths
Pre-Confederation Canadian businesspeople
Businesspeople from Montreal
Conservative Party of Canada (1867–1942) senators
People from Laurentides
Mayors of Montreal
Conservative Party of Quebec MNAs
Canadian senators from Quebec
Burials at Notre Dame des Neiges Cemetery